The Check Mii Out Channel, known as the  in Europe, Oceania and Japan, was a channel for the Nintendo Wii that allowed players to share their digital avatars, called Miis, and enter them into popularity contests.

Nintendo ended support for the Check Mii Out Channel on June 28, 2013, along with four more Wii channels as WiiConnect24, which the channel required, was permanently disconnected.

Posting Plaza

Users were able to submit their Mii(s) for other Mii creators around the world to view. When a Mii was submitted to the Posting Plaza, a twelve-digit entry number was assigned to it (#### - #### - ####), so others could find it using the search function. The submitted Miis were also given two initials by their creator and the Mii's talent. If a person liked a Mii, it could be imported to his or her Mii Channel plaza. An imported Mii could not be edited, but could have been used in Wii games that use the Mii interface. People could favorite Miis, and the Mii would be given a rank out of five stars, depending on how many people liked the Mii. The artisan was also given a ratings rank of anywhere from one to five stars.

Every month, the Posting Plaza had a "Mii Artisan" ranking section that lasted for the entire month. The first ranking Mii Artisan by the end of the month was declared a "Master Mii Artisan".

Wii Message Board

Check Mii Out was the first Wii channel that used the Wii message board. When WiiConnect24 was turned on, Nintendo would send a message as soon as new contests began or when a contest update was available, if the user had set up an Internet connection. If a user didn't want to receive these messages from Nintendo, they could opt out by going to the settings in the Check Mii Out Menu or the opt out button when viewing one of the messages that were sent to the Wii console.

Wii Menu Icon

Scrolling headlines of a contest and a picture above it appeared on the Check Mii Out Channel icon when an update to a contest was available.

Highest Mii Ranking Level and Judging eye

These stats were located in the "Mii Artisan Info" section of the Main Menu. The "Highest Mii Ranking" stat showed the highest ranking that the user had ever gotten on a contest, and the "Judging Eye" stat showed the user's most recent ranking for judging. Note that this was the user's most recent judging rank, not the best rank.

Contests
The Check Mii Out Channel had new contests going on all the time. Players submitted a Mii that they thought fitted the category, and they were judged by other players.

At the end of a contest, a "Level System" was shown on a 1-10 scale (10 being the highest, and 1 the lowest). The Mii that the user had created would be running up the mountain. One's Mii would be based on a 1-10 scale, and if it stopped at a certain spot (ex: 5th layer), the user's Mii would be ranked at the corresponding level. This system was reverse-scored from the normal games; in other words, 10 was best, and 1 was worst. One's "Eye for Miis" was how one judged other people's Miis. A high Mii ranking indicated that the user was a great judge. The user was then shown the first place Mii, along with its "Artisan." This lead into the top 50 Miis for the contest, viewable either as a "Parade" or "Arranged".

For certain contests, those who participated in a contest could create a souvenir photo that showed their submitted Mii and their artisan placed and posed on top of a background related to the contest theme. The image could then be sent to the Wii Message Board. Souvenir photos were usually related to Wii games such as Super Mario Galaxy.

Nintendo-themed contests

Discontinuation
As part of Nintendo's WiiConnect24 service for the Nintendo Wii console, the Check Mii Out Channel / Mii Contest Channel was discontinued alongside the other services offered under WiiConnect24.

RiiConnect24 has brought back this service to people who have homebrewed Wiis. It can also be played on Dolphin.

References

External links
 A full list of contests at GamerWiki
 Celebrity Mii designs

Wii software
Products introduced in 2007
Products and services discontinued in 2013
Internet properties established in 2007
Internet properties disestablished in 2013

ja:Mii#Miiコンテストチャンネル